Tim Inglis (born March 10, 1964) is a former American football linebacker. He played for the Cincinnati Bengals from 1987 to 1988.

References

1964 births
Living people
American football linebackers
Toledo Rockets football players
Cincinnati Bengals players